The 1920 Xalapa earthquake was the deadliest in Mexico's history prior to 1985—killing at least 648 people. It occurred on January 3 at 22:25 local time, during a period of political unrest in the country. Mudflows and landslides triggered by the shock destroyed buildings in rural towns across the states of Veracruz and Puebla, causing most of the deaths. The earthquake was attributed to a shallow fault in the Trans-Mexican Volcanic Belt. It measured moment magnitude 6.3–6.4 and had a hypocenter depth of <. The Mexican government took immediate action in the aftermath—providing assistance and establishing communication services. Severely damaged towns including Xalapa were rebuilt, while others had to be abandoned. Help to survivors also came from civil society groups, civilians, and the Catholic Church. The earthquake's aftershocks were studied by scientists to determine its seismological characteristics.

Background

Mexico underwent significant political, military and social conflicts during the early 20th century. In 1919 and early 1920, the revolution was anticipated to end with President Venustiano Carranza overthrown. Carranza's preference for Ignacio Bonillas and other officials to succeed him brought dissatisfaction within his government. This led to a rebellion against Carranza and the formation of the Plan of Agua Prieta to disregard Carranza's government. Carranza was assassinated in Puebla on May 21, 1920, during his escape to Veracruz. Between 1919 and 1920, Veracruz went through various governments and its political scene became stable after Adalberto Tejeda was elected as governor. Tejeda's government rarely made references to the earthquake in the early part of his term between October 1920 and May 1921.

Tectonics 

Mexico is located at a junction where three tectonic plates converge. The Mexican landmass is situated atop the North American Plate which moves westwards. Off its Pacific coast, oceanic lithosphere from the Cocos and Rivera plates subducts in a northeasterly direction along the Middle America Trench. Earthquakes and tsunamis are generated on the subduction zone when seismic strain accumulated at the interface between the subducting and overriding plates is released, causing a rupture. Volcanism occurs when the subducting plates (known as slabs) undergo metamorphism, dehydrates, and melts the mantle into magma, which then rises through the overriding plate to form volcanoes.

The Trans-Mexican Volcanic Belt (TMVB) stretches > from Mexico's Pacific coast to the Gulf of Mexico. The TMVB runs oblique to the trench where the Cocos and Rivera plates subduct due to the difference in subduction angle. In Jalisco, the Rivera Plate subducts at ~50°. From Michoacán to Guerrero (eastwards), the Cocos Plate subducts at a progressively decreasing angle. From Oaxaca to Central America, the subduction angle increases to ~50–60°.

Most slabs undergo metamorphism at  depth, which is ~ away from the trench. In Mexico, the slabs attain this depth ~ away. Due to the subduction geometry, the volcanic arc gradually migrates away from the trench and forms inland. Beneath the TMVB, the Cocos Plate plunge steeply into the mantle. Shallow intraplate earthquakes within the TMVB are located north of where these intraslab earthquakes occur. Crustal deformation in the TMVB is characterized by extension. Deformation occurs along east–west striking normal faults that displace Quaternary volcanic rocks of the belt. Normal faults northwest of Mexico City also display small (10 percent of total slip) left-lateral strike-slip movement.

Geology 

Shallow crustal earthquakes in the TMVB have been recorded for 450 years. These earthquakes, although infrequent, are damaging in central Mexico. These have been estimated to be as large as 7.6  (in 1858). Xalapa was previously damaged by an earthquake in 1546. The earthquake destroyed the church of San Francisco and the nearby convent—the Catholic church was the first to be constructed in the Americas. Seismicity in the area is infrequent—the largest earthquake since 1964 was a 5.1  shock in 1979. The earthquakes of 1912 (6.9 ) and 1920 are examples of recent major earthquakes in the TMVB. The former caused significant destruction and killed at least 161 people.

The National Seismological Service (NSS) operated three seismic instruments at the time of the earthquake; located in Mexico City, Oaxaca, and Mazatlán, respectively. Stations close to the epicenter (in Puebla and Veracruz) were inoperable due to the Mexican Revolution. An epicenter could not be instrumentally located due to the limited seismic data. The epicenter was likely between the towns of Chilchotla and Patlanalán, based on the seismic intensity, where the strongest shaking was observed. Foreshocks were observed in the same area in November 1919.

The earthquake had a focal mechanism corresponding to normal (and some strike-slip) faulting along an east–west striking plane. Earthquakes in the volcanic belt display normal faulting mechanism at < depth. The fault length corresponded to the area of maximum damage and strongest shaking, and aligned parallel with the Huitzilapan River. In 1996, a  lineament identified via satellite imaging was suggested as the source fault.

The aftershock sequence was intense and lasted until April 1920. An  Wiechert vertical seismograph was transported by rail to the epicenter area to record the aftershocks. Aftershock data obtained by the seismograph demonstrated that the mainshock was a shallow-focus earthquake.

Ground features initially interpreted to be surface faulting were documented in a 1922 field report. However, this has been attributed to probable soft soil slumping along the steep slopes of the volcanic region. The lack of observable faulting suggests rupture to the surface was insignificant or buried under debris and mud avalanches.

The earthquake magnitude was previously listed as 7.8  (surface-wave magnitude). This has been considered a far-fetched and non-instrumental estimate biased by the reported effects of the earthquake. Instead, surface-wave and moment magnitude ( and ) 6.4 was estimated from available data. The International Seismological Centre catalogued the earthquake magnitude at  6.3.

Damage and casualties 

There were at least 648 deaths from the earthquake, and the toll may be as high as 4,000. It was the deadliest earthquake in Mexico's history until 1985 (currently the second deadliest). Seismicity in Veracruz is moderate compared to Mexico's Pacific coast. Some earthquakes with epicenters in Veracruz have resulted in fatalities, such as those in 1959 and 1967. The 1973 earthquake had an epicenter outside the state and also resulted in many deaths and widespread destruction.

Many deaths were associated with landslides and mudslides. Serious damage was reported in Xalapa, Coatepec, Teocelo, Cosautlán, Ixhuacán, Ayahualulco, Calcahualco, Coscomatepec, Alpatláhuac, Rinconada, Huatusco and Córdoba. Shaking was felt as far as Toluca in the State of Mexico and throughout the central part of Mexico. The towns of Chilchotla, Quimixtlán and Patlanalá were within the epicenter area—Modified Mercalli intensity XI–XII (Extreme) was evaluated. In Xalapa, the shaking intensity was not greater than VIII–IX (Severe–Violent). The towns of Ayahualulco, Cosautlán and Teocelo felt intensities IX–X (Violent–Extreme). Intensity XI (Extreme) occurred in Ixhuacán. In Mexico City, shaking was III–IV (Weak–Light). Shaking was felt as far as Oaxaca, where the intensity in Teotitlán, Cuicatlán and San Jerónimo was III (Weak).

Landslides and mudslides were widely reported, triggered by factors including the orography, vegetation type and high humidity. The mudslides originated from landslides triggered along the steep valley slopes of the Huitzilapa River and tributaries between Chilchotla and Patlanalán. The mudflows traveled down the Huitzilapa and Pescado rivers, destroying towns and sweeping away up humans in the process. At least 419 deaths were caused by the mudslides. Only 10 people were injured in Patlanalá despite being the town with the most deaths (239). This was because most residents who were swept away perished. In Teocelo and Cosautlán, most deaths were caused by collapses. The mudslide traveled nearly  before entering the Gulf of Mexico. The communities of Acuatlatipa, El Rincón, Mecatitla, and Petlacuacán were buried.

The earthquake only devastated poorly constructed buildings. Heavy destruction was attributed to building materials—most were constructed with heavy stone, brick and lime. These structures were not designed for areas with seismic vulnerability. Most fragile brick buildings were razed. Major towns including Xalapa, Teocelo, and Cosautlán experienced fewer casualties compared to those in the rural mountainous area. However, these localities reported heavier property losses in collapses. In Teocelo, offices, homes, schools, and official buildings were seriously affected. In Xalapa, only three people died. The Dos Corazones church partially collapsed and damaged nearby houses, injuring several. The streets of Leona Vicario, Ramos Arizpe, Allende, Abasolo, Libertad, Sayago, Enriquez, Zamora, and Colon were the most affected. Orphanages, government offices, palaces, and other public infrastructures were damaged.

An official from Soledad de Doblado said water from the Jamapa River deposited mud which contaminated the water supply. Mudflows carrying bodies and debris continued to flow towards Jalcomulco. In Barranca Grande, 180 of its 300 residents died. Deaths in Patlanalá and Quimixtlán were mainly attributed to landslides, avalanches, and mudflows. A total of 167 were injured, including 85 in Teocelo and 60 in Cosautlán. Ten people were reported injured in Quimixtlán and Xalapa, respectively. Landslides in Orizaba damaged a few homes.

Aftermath

The disaster was sensationalized by the media—initial reports indicated several thousand deaths and dozens injured. Newspapers misinformed the public in the aftermath with exaggerated reports of destruction. Some newspapers also reported lava, flames, and gas emissions from a volcano outside Xalapa, Huaxcaleca, San Nicolás, and the Jacal and Tlacotiopan ranches. To drive sensationalism, reports later changed to volcanic activity occurring on Pico de Orizaba and Cofre de Perote which are considered inaccurate. Many newspapers became unreliable in reporting the number of dead. The only proper sources of information were commissions from the Geological Institute of Mexico.

The Mexican government immediately established communication with the affected area by providing telegrams to be kept informed of the situation. Even so, very little information was conveyed by officials from major towns. Information from rural towns took several days to arrive due to cut telegraph lines and damaged roads. After sufficient information was obtained, the government created a relief board. The board consisted of government authorities and civilians. Boards were also formed to help in reconstruction. In the days following the earthquake, officials visited the area to provide relief. Some towns were inaccessible due to landslides. The civil hospital in Xalapa was overwhelmed by many injured patients and insufficient beds. The building was severely cracked and at risk of collapse. Several survivors in the hospital were traumatized and had to be restrained by nurses.

Federal aid was immediately distributed to the worst-affected areas. Reconstruction work followed—the restoration of paintings and decorations was estimated at $11,920, while $1,445 was used to replace windows and doors. The cost of infrastructure damage was not specified. Xalapa, Coatepec, and Cosautlán were allocated $60,000, each, for building reconstruction. Coscomatepec was allocated $25,000, while $20,000 was allocated to Patlanalá, Quimixtlan and Huatusco, respectively. About $40,000 was allocated for survivors. The Governor of Sonora, Adolfo de la Huerta, donated $4,078 for survivors.

The municipal government of San Francisco de las Peñas began a donation drive, and state government employees offered to contribute a day of their pay for survivors. Rafael Guízar y Valencia, Bishop of Veracruz, visited the area to assist in recovery efforts. He arrived in Veracruz the day after the earthquake and together with state officials, coordinated in relief and donation drives. In the city of Veracruz, which was unaffected, $20,000 in donation was contributed. Rafael Guízar also officiated a sermon in the affected town of Teocelo. While visiting the town, he handled out $3,000 among residents. Rafael Guízar often conducted sermons in the outdoors because buildings were unsafe. He continued to tour the area until 1921. The Catholic Church spent about $231,000 to reconstruct Xalapa by employing workers from other areas of Mexico.

Civil societies including clubs, public administration, religious cults and Red Cross organizations also assisted survivors or participated in reconstruction works. Most of their contributions were indirect—raising money and lottery. Groups closer to the affected area kept in close contact with residents. Two American Red Cross members, including Harry Hopkins, visited the area in February to assess the damage and survivors needs.

Future hazard

Lying along the Ring of Fire, Mexico is one of the most seismically active regions of the world. Most of Mexico's large earthquakes originate along the subduction zone off its Pacific coast. A September 2021 earthquake near Acapulco, Guerrero sparked concerns among scientists due to its proximity to a seismic gap. Named the "Guerrero Gap", it is a  section of the subduction zone that has not experienced an earthquake since 1911, despite one expected to happen every 30 to 50 years. Although the gap partially ruptured during an earthquake in 2014, the remaining unruptured segment may produce an earthquake of up to magnitude 7.8. Mexico City and its population of 20 million are vulnerable to an earthquake along the gap.

Nearly 52 million people or 40 percent of Mexico's population live around the earthquake-prone TMVB. Due to the lack of instrumentally recorded large earthquakes in the TMVB, it was classified as a non-hazardous region by long-established studies of seismic hazard. The study of historical earthquakes dating back to the 16th century suggests the region is more vulnerable to earthquakes than previously thought. Due to their recurrence intervals spanning millenniums, they are a rare occurrence. These earthquakes, although moderate in size compared to their subduction zone counterparts, can be destructive when striking a densely populated area. Most residents in the volcanic belt do not have generational recollections of these earthquakes, and hence are unprepared for one.

See also 
 Geography of Mexico
 List of earthquakes in Mexico
 List of earthquakes in 1920

Notes

References

Sources

1920 earthquakes
1920 in Mexico
Xalapa
History of Veracruz
History of Puebla
Landslides in Mexico
Buried rupture earthquakes
January 1920 events
1920 disasters in Mexico